Coristaca is a monotypic genus of tortrix moths. Its sole species, 
Coristaca capsularia, is found in Costa Rica.

The wingspan is about 13 mm. The ground colour of the forewings is blackish grey, but whitish at the costa beyond the median marking and discal cell. There are several concolorous or slightly darker scales. The remaining area is suffused and diffusely strigulated (finely streaked) with blackish. The hindwings are whitish, suffused with black grey on the periphery and strigulated with a similar colour.

References

Cochylini
Monotypic moth genera
Tortricidae genera
Taxa named by Józef Razowski